This is a list of events and openings related to amusement parks that occurred in 2021. These various lists are not exhaustive.

Amusement parks

Opening

Armenia Yerevan Park – May 15
Czech Republic Majaland Praha
China Hot Go Dreamworld
China Universal Studios Beijing – September 1 (soft opening)  September 20 (grand opening)
U.S. Legoland New York – May 29
China Fantasy Valley
China Fenghuang Paradise - January 1
China Fuli Ocean Happy World
Qatar Doha Oasis Quest
China Jinan Sunac Land
Italy Legoland Water Park Gardaland – June 15
China Fuli Ocean Happy World - December 22

Reopened
Belgium Plopsa Station Antwerp – October 2021

Change of name
Belgium Comic Station Antwerp » Plopsa Station Antwerp
U.S. Fantasy Island » Niagara Amusement Park & Splash World
U.S. Six Flags Hurricane Harbor Gurnee » Six Flags Hurricane Harbor Chicago

Change of ownership
U.S. Clementon Park and Splash World – Premier Parks, LLC » Indiana Beach Holdings, LLC (now known as IB Parks & Entertainment)
U.S. Fantasy Island – Apex Parks Group » Indiana Beach Holdings, LLC (now known as IB Parks & Entertainment)
U.S. Kentucky Kingdom – Themeparks LLC » Herschend Family Entertainment
U.S. Adventureland – Adventure Lands of America Inc. » Palace Entertainment

Birthday

 Beijing Shijingshan Amusement Park - 35th birthday
 California's Great America - 45th birthday
 Walt Disney World Resort - 50th birthday
 Canada's Wonderland - 40th birthday
 Chimelong Paradise - 15th birthday
 Disney California Adventure - 20th birthday
 Dreamworld - 40th birthday
 Lagoon Amusement Park - 135th birthday
 Legoland Florida - 10th birthday
 Magic Kingdom - 50th birthday
 Michigan's Adventure - 65th birthday
 MagicLand - 20th birthday
 Toverland - 20th birthday
 Trans Studio Bandung - 10th birthday
 Six Flags Great America - 45th birthday
 Six Flags Magic Mountain - 50th birthday
 Six Flags Over Texas - 60th birthday
 Six Flags St. Louis - 50th birthday
 Sea World - 50th birthday
 Valleyfair - 45th birthday
 Warner Bros. Movie World - 30th birthday
 WhiteWater World - 15th birthday

Closed
 Fenghuang Paradise
 Aquatica San Diego – September 12
 De Valkenier – July
 Barry's Amusements

Additions

Roller coasters

New

Relocated

Refurbished

Other attractions

New

Relocated

Refurbished

Closed attractions & roller coasters

Themed accommodation

New
 Universal Beijing Resort — May 18 (soft opening) June 1 (grand opening)

Incidents and accidents

Fatal
 Adventureland - On 3 July, a raft carrying 6 passengers on the Raging River river rapids ride overturned, killing an 11-year-old boy and seriously injuring 3 others.
 Glenwood Caverns Adventure Park - On 5 September, a 6-year-old girl was killed after falling from the Haunted Mine Drop underground drop tower. The incident is currently under investigation.
 Hayrola Luna Park - A 19-year-old teenager chocked to death on her own vomit when she was riding the Kamikaze frisbee ride. The ride operators reportedly refused to stop the ride.
 Lagoon Amusement Park - A 32-year-old man fell almost  to his death on the Sky Ride chair lift. He was seen clinging onto the safety bar.

Non-fatal
 Blackpool Pleasure Beach - On 25 April, riders were forced to climb down the top of the lift hill on the Big One roller coaster at the Blackpool Pleasure Beach after it broke down.
 Cedar Point - On 15 August, a 44-year-old woman was seriously injured after she was struck by a L-shaped piece of metal while waiting in the queue for Top Thrill Dragster. The ride was closed for the remainder of the season.
 Six Flags Great Adventure - On 13 June, 2 riders were injured when the Saw Mill Log Flume tipped at an angle.
 Six Flags Great Adventure - On 29 June, the train on El Toro partially derailed when the rear car's up-stop wheels, which are designed to prevent the train from lifting off the track, moved out of place and up onto the track. There were no reported injuries.

Notes

References

Amusement parks by year
Amusement parks